The 1937–38 OB I bajnokság season was the second season of the OB I bajnokság, the top level of ice hockey in Hungary. Five teams participated in the league, and BKE Budapest won the championship.

Regular season

External links
 Season on hockeyarchives.info

Hun
OB I bajnoksag seasons
1937–38 in Hungarian ice hockey